William André Harvey (October 9, 1941 – February 6, 2018) was an American sculptor whose realistic and contemporary works are primarily cast in bronze using the lost wax method. Harvey also worked in granite, collage, painting, and  produced intricate sculptural jewelry cast in gold. He worked in the Brandywine Valley, in Rockland near Wilmington, Delaware.

Biography 

Harvey was born in Hollywood, Florida and raised in Pocopson, Pennsylvania. He earned a bachelor's degree in English from the University of Virginia in 1963. In 1969, after working both as a journalist and an educator, he and his wife, Bobbie quit their jobs in search of a life change and traveled through Europe and Morocco. During this period, Harvey met and worked with abstract sculptor Michel Anasse, in Vallauris, France, which resulted in his focus on sculpture as a career.

Once back in the US, Harvey began creating small and large-scale realistic sculptures inspired by his childhood growing up in rural Pocopson, near Chadds Ford, Pennsylvania. Harvey's first high-profile exposure was the exhibition of five sculptures for the five windows at Tiffany & Company, New York. Since that time, in a career spanning over four decades, Harvey has produced an extensive volume of work which has been purchased by numerous public and private collections, and has been featured in exhibitions both nationally and internationally.

He was a Fellow and former board member of the National Sculpture Society, New York. Harvey received the National Sculpture Society's Joel Meissner Award and the Tallix Foundry Award.

On June 15 and 16, 2017, the Hagley Museum and Library produced a two part oral history, Interview with André and Bobbie Harvey.

Public outdoor sculptures 

Botanic Garden Center and Conservatory, Fort Worth, TX
The Frederik Meijer Gardens, Grand Rapids, MI
Winterthur Museum, Gardens and Library, Winterthur, DE
Port Charlotte Town Center, Port Charlotte, FL
Mt. Cuba Center, Hockessin, DE
Brandywine River Museum of Art, Chadds Ford, PA
Crystal Bridges Museum of American Art, Bentonville, AR
University of Delaware, Newark, DE
Longwood Gardens, Kennett Square, PA
Hagley Museum and Library, Wilmington, DE
Brookgreen Gardens, Murrells Inlet, SC

Exhibitions 

Nature in Art Trust, Gloucester, U.K.
Palazzo Mediceo, Seravessa, Italy
National Sculpture Society, New York, NY
Fleischer Museum, Masterworks of American Sculpture, Scottsdale, AZ
Contemporary Sculpture at Chesterwood, Stockbridge, MA
Art in Embassies Program, Yarralumla, Australia, Lilongwe, Malawi and Lusaka, Zambia
National Academy of Design, New York, NY
National Audubon Society, New York, NY
Hunter Museum, Chattanooga, TN
Brandywine River Museum of Art, Chadds Ford, PA
Mystic Maritime Gallery, Mystic, CT
Gibbs Museum of Art, Charleston, SC
Longwood Gardens, Kennett Square, PA
Philadelphia Flower Show, Philadelephia, PA

Public Collections 

Mississippi Museum of Art, Jackson, MS
University of Virginia, Charlottesville, VA
Delaware Art Museum, Wilmington, DE
Greenville County Museum of Art, Greenville, SC
Crown Controls Corporation, New Bremen, OH
Muskegon Art Museum, Muskegon, MI
Texas Energy Reserve Corporation, Humble, TX
Hunter Museum of American Art, Chattanooga, TN
Mystic Seaport Museum, Mystic, CT
Art in Embassies, Washington, DC
Brandywine River Museum of Art, Chadds Ford, PA
Nature in Art Trust, Gloucestershire, UK

Sources 
Quillman, Catherine, author. Artists of the Brandywine Valley, Schiffer Publishing, Ltd., 2010, pp. 70–71.
Allys Palladino-Craig, editor. High Roads and Low Roads, Florida State University Museum of Fine Arts Exhibition, 2006, pp. 34–35.
Williams, Arthur, author. The Sculpture Reference, Sculpture Books Publishing, 2005, pp. 173, 266, 312, 400, 472.
Nature in Art, Marine Conservation Society, U.K., Making Waves – A Celebration of the Sea (brochure), April 2005, p. 18.
Levine, Adam and Rogers, Ray, authors. The Philadelphia Flower Show Celebrating 175 Years, Ei Ei O, Harper Collins Publishers, 2003, pp. 208–209.
Jinishian, J. Russell, author. Bound for Blue Water – Contemporary American Marine Art, The Greenwich Workshop Press, 2003, p. 167.
Fleischer Museum, Master Works of American Sculpture, brochure, 1999–2000.
Longwood Gardens, GardenFest at Longwood Gardens September 14–29, 1996 : a guide to displays and activities., brochure and map, September 1996.
Edgeworth, Anthony and Zeidner, Lisa, authors. Brandywine, Thomasson-Grant Publishers, 1995, pp. 198–199.
National Sculpture Society, All American Sculpture, 1995, p. 11.
The New York Times, Museum's Pig Is Stolen, June 29, 1995.
Benson, Clea, writer. The Philadelphia Inquirer, Philadelphia, PA, This Not-so-little Piggie Is Home Helen, A 400-pound Sculpture, Has Been Returned. She'll Soon Grace Brandywine Museum Grounds Again., June 30, 1995.
Dowell, Susan Stiles, author. Southern Accents, Pure Brandywine, March/April 1993, pp. 146–151.
Henry, Jean, editor. 'National Sculpture Society, "Contemporary Figurative Sculpture," The National Sculpture Society Celebrates the Figure, 1987, p. 99.
Loeb, Vernon, The Philadelphia Inquirer, Philadelphia, PA, Now It's in to be High on the Hog, August 6, 1978, p. 1A.
Parker, Barry, writer.  Chattanooga News-Free Press, Artist Warhol Joins Notable for Opening of Harvey Show, March 20, 1977.
Hasden, West. The Chattanooga Times, Andre Harvey's Sculpture Show Opens Today, March 20, 1977.
Wallace, Andrew, writer. Philadelphia Inquirer, So Real You Expect Bronze to Come to Life, September 5, 1976.

References

External links 
Official website

1941 births
2018 deaths
20th-century American sculptors
20th-century American male artists
21st-century American sculptors
People from Hollywood, Florida
University of Virginia alumni